Bernardo Oliveira is a Brazilian-Australian professional soccer player who plays as an winger for Adelaide United.

Career
Bernardo made his Adelaide United debut in a 3–1 win over Floreat Athena in the 2021 FFA Cup Round of 32.

International career
Bernardo is of Brazilian descent through his father but has represented Australia at youth level.

Personal life
He is the son of former Adelaide United player Cássio Oliveira.

References

External links

Living people
2004 births
Australian people of Brazilian descent
Australian soccer players
Association football midfielders
Adelaide United FC players
Melbourne City FC players
National Premier Leagues players
A-League Men players